Ali Mohammad Khademi (24 May 1913 – 7 November 1978) was the general manager of Iran Air from 1962 until 1978.

Early life 
Khademi was born in Jahrom. He studied at the Military Academy and Air Force Flying School in Tehran, British Civil Aviation Authority in London and US Air Force University in Alabama.

According to Persian-language book Tarikhcheh-ye Havapeymai-e Bazargani dar Iran (Abbas Atrvash, 2007), from 1958 Khademi was the chief of staff at Iranian Air Force and from 1962 to 1978 he was the general manager of Iran Air. During his 16-year tenure there, "the company was transformed from a fledgling domestic airline to a thriving national flag-carrier."

Khademi was the president of IATA in 1970–1971.

In September 1978, shortly before the Islamic Revolution in his homeland, Khademi resigned from his job and on November 7, 1978, he was assassinated in his home in Tehran.

References

External links
40th Anniversary of Ali-Mohammad Khademi Assassination in Tehran (BBC Persian Service)

Iran Air
People from Jahrom
Chief executives in the airline industry
People murdered in Iran
1913 births
1978 deaths
Air University (United States Air Force) alumni
20th-century Iranian people
People of Pahlavi Iran